Joan Boocock Lee (5 February 1922 – 6 July 2017) was a British-American model and voice actress. She was the wife of comic book creator Stan Lee, whom she met in New York City in the 1940s while working as a hat model. In her later years, Lee became a voice actress and appeared in the Spider-Man and Fantastic Four animated series in the 1990s. Kevin Smith referred to Joan as "Stan's personal superhero" and "Marvel Muse".

Early life
Joan Boocock's birth was registered in the first quarter of 1922 in Castle Ward Rural District (now part of Newcastle's Metropolitan Borough) according to her birth register records. Her father, Norman Dunton Boocock married her mother Hannah Clayton in the Castle Ward district of Northumberland in 1920. In one interview, she stated that she was born in Gosforth, Newcastle, and grew up there and in Fawdon. After World War II, she relocated to the United States as a war bride after marrying an American serviceman, Sanford Dorf Weiss, whom she had only known for 24 hours prior to their marriage in 1943.

Marriage to Stan Lee

In her early years, Joan Boocock was a well-known hat model before moving to the United States as a war bride. She separated from Dorf not long after.
 
Lee's cousin had set him up on a blind date with a different model at the agency Joan worked. When Lee went to the modelling agency to meet his intended date, Joan answered the door instead.  Upon seeing her he immediately professed his love for her and told her he had been drawing her face since childhood.

Lee proposed after two weeks of dating, and she went to Reno, Nevada in order to nullify her previous marriage. On 5 December 1947, she received an annulment for her previous marriage, then married Lee in the room next door. Together, they had two daughters, Joan Celia "J. C." Lee (b. 1950), and Jan Lee, who died eight days after delivery in 1953. As an interfaith couple they subsequently faced difficulty adopting. In 1949, the couple bought a two-story, three-bedroom home in Woodmere, Long Island, living there through 1952.

Lee credited Joan as being the inspiration for early incarnations of the Fantastic Four. She was also the inspiration of Gwen Stacy, Spider-Man's second girlfriend in the comics.

Career
In 1981, Stan and Joan Lee moved from New York City to Los Angeles. There, she lent her voice to several animated Marvel shows in the 1990s. She first appeared in Fantastic Four in 1994, voicing a reoccurring character. She voiced a computer in the Iron Man television series for three episodes in 1994. She later appeared in Spider-Man as Madame Web, appearing in eight episodes from 1996 to 1998.

In 2002, she appeared as herself alongside Stan Lee and Kevin Smith in Stan Lee's Mutants, Monsters & Marvels. In 2003, she appeared as herself in the documentary Comic Book Superheroes Unmasked. In 2010, she appeared in a documentary about her husband called With Great Power: The Stan Lee Story. Lee made her last appearance in a cameo in the 2016 film X-Men: Apocalypse alongside her husband.

Writing
In 1987, Joan Lee wrote The Pleasure Palace, her first novel. According to her daughter, Joan had also completed three unpublished novels.

Death
Lee died on 6 July 2017, in Los Angeles from stroke-related complications. Her husband of almost 70 years, and their daughter, Joan, were present as she died. Although several sources gave her age as 93 at the time of her death, British birth records show she was, in fact, 95 years old.

Filmography

References

External links
 

1922 births
2017 deaths
British emigrants to the United States
English voice actresses
Stan Lee
People from Gosforth